Gerd Schager (born 18 June 1944) is an Austrian former ice hockey player. He competed in the men's tournament at the 1968 Winter Olympics.

References

External links
 

1944 births
Living people
Ice hockey players at the 1968 Winter Olympics
Olympic ice hockey players of Austria
People from Sankt Veit an der Glan
Sportspeople from Carinthia (state)